Barrillas Airport  is an airport serving Puerto Barillas, a small-craft dockage on an arm of the Bahia de Jiquilisco,  southwest of Usulután in Usulután Department, El Salvador.

See also

Transport in El Salvador
List of airports in El Salvador

References

External links
 OpenStreetMap - Barrillas
 HERE/Nokia - Barrillas
 Barrillas

Airports in El Salvador